Count Wilhelm Kinsky von Wchinitz (1574 – 25 February 1634) was a Czech landowner and a statesman. By birth, he was member of the House of Kinsky, which belonged to the highest circle of Bohemian aristocracy.

Early life 
Wilhelm was born as the younger son of Johann Kinsky von Wchinitz, Burggraf of Karlštejn (1540-1590) and his wife, Anna Pauzar von Michnic (d. 1598), daughter of Johann Pauzar von Michnic.

Biography
In 1628, Wilhelm Kinsky was elevated to the rank of Count in the Bohemian nobility when Wallenstein was elevated to Duchy of Friedland. As a rich landowner in Bohemia, Kinsky lived in exile at Dresden after the Battle of White Mountain, because he was a Protestant and, unlike the members of the Trčka family, had refused to convert to the Catholic faith but was allowed to regularly visit his Bohemian estates. Subsequently, together with his brother-in-law Adam Erdmann Trčka, he attempted to pull Wallenstein over to the Protestant and Swedish side.

Kinsky was assassinated during the Thirty Years' War, on 25 February 1634 at Cheb, together with Trčka and other officers loyal to the general and the Field Marshal himself, during the so-called Eger Bloodbath, a plot to purge the Imperial Army from Albrecht von Wallenstein's supporters. Kinsky's estates, among them Teplice, were confiscated by Emperor Ferdinand II.

Personal life 
Wilhelm Kinsky married Countess Elisabeth Magdalena Trčka von Lípa, whose brother Adam Erdmann Trčka von Lípa was married with Countess Maximiliane von Harrach, a sister of Albrecht von Wallensteins second wife. They had:
 Count Adolf Ernst Kinsky von Wchinitz (d. after 1648); married Elisabeth Killgrew. They had:
 Count Wilhelm Leopold Kinsky von Wchinitz (d. 1709); married Franziska Rosalie Berka of Dubá. They had no issue
 Count Ulrich Kinsky von Wchinitz (d. after 1648)
 Count Philipp Moritz Kinsky von Wchinitz (d. after 1648)

References

Bibliography 
 Otto's encyclopedia at 
 
 Official pages of the family Kinsky: Vilém Kinský a Albrecht Václav Eusebius z Valdštejna
 Joachim Whaley: Germany and the Holy Roman Empire:Volume I: Maximilian I to the Peace of Westphalia, 1493-1648,Oxford University Press 2011
 Hamish M. Scott: The European nobilities in the seventeenth and eighteenth centuries, Volume 2, Longman, 1995

1574 births
1634 deaths
Bohemian nobility
Wilhelm Kinsky
People from Cheb
Assassinated nobility